Ko Cha-won (born 30 April 1986) is a South Korean football player who plays for Cheonan City.

External links 
 

1986 births
Living people
Footballers from Seoul
Association football midfielders
South Korean footballers
Jeonnam Dragons players
Gimcheon Sangmu FC players
Suwon Samsung Bluewings players
Seoul E-Land FC players
K League 1 players
K League 2 players
Korea National League players